Julien Henry Guy Benneteau-Desgrois (born 20 December 1981) is a French retired professional tennis player. His career-high singles ranking is ATP world no. 25, which he reached in November 2014. He formerly resided in Boulogne-Billancourt and now lives in Geneva. Benneteau did not win a singles title, although he finished as runner-up in ten ATP tournaments (holding match point in the 2013 Kuala Lumpur final). He reached the quarterfinals of the 2006 French Open and the semifinals of the 2014 Cincinnati Masters and 2017 Paris Masters (the latter as a wildcard). Benneteau also had success in doubles, winning the bronze medal in men's doubles at the 2012 London Olympics (partnering Richard Gasquet) and the 2014 French Open men's doubles title with fellow Frenchman Édouard Roger-Vasselin, thus becoming the first team from France to win the men's doubles discipline in 30 years (after Yannick Noah and Henri Leconte did it in 1984). He reached his career-high doubles ranking of world no. 5 in November 2014. Benneteau intended to retire from professional tennis after the 2018 US Open. However, due to an injury crisis he was asked by captain Yannick Noah to represent France in the Davis Cup semifinal in September 2018 against Spain. Benneteau teamed up with Nicolas Mahut to secure a decisive victory that took France to an unassailable 3-0 lead against Spain and into the final of the 2018 Davis Cup. Benneteau subsequently played several further events in singles and doubles, concluding his professional career on home soil at the Paris Masters.

Tennis career

Junior career
In the 1999 Orange Bowl Benneteau won the Boys 16s double title.

As a junior, Benneteau reached as high as no. 17 in the world in 1999, and no. 1 in doubles.

He won US Open Junior with Nicolas Mahut in 1999.

Professional career
At the 2006 French Open, Benneteau reached the quarterfinals by defeating Janko Tipsarević, Australian Open finalist Marcos Baghdatis, Radek Štěpánek, and Alberto Martín. There, he was defeated in straight sets by fourth-seeded Ivan Ljubičić of Croatia.

The Frenchman finished the 2008 season in the top 50 for the second time in three years. During the season, he reached two ATP finals, at Casablanca, where he lost to fellow countryman Gilles Simon, and in his final tournament of the season at Lyon, where he lost to Robin Söderling.

In May 2009, he entered the Interwetten Austrian Open in Kitzbühel as a lucky loser and reached his third career final, falling to Spain's Guillermo García-López.

In the quarterfinals of the 2009 Western & Southern Financial Group Masters, he played a remarkable 53-shot rally with the then world no. 2 Andy Murray in the second set of a three-set loss. He lost the rally when he smashed a lob that grazed the net and went wide.

His best career victory was undoubtedly achieved on 11 November 2009 at the 2009 Paris Masters, when he scored a huge upset over world no. 1 Roger Federer in the second round in front of his home crowd.

He reached the third round of the 2012 French Open, losing to world no. 8 Janko Tipsarević.

In the third round of Wimbledon 2012, Benneteau led Federer by two sets before eventually being defeated in five sets. In the 2012 Olympics in London, he captured the bronze medal in doubles with Richard Gasquet.

At the 2013 ABN AMRO Open in Rotterdam, Benneteau again beat top seed and defending champion Federer in the quarterfinals. He beat compatriot Gilles Simon in the semifinals, but was not able to overcome Juan Martín del Potro in the final, disappointingly failing yet again to clinch a title. During the clay season, he beat Nicolás Almagro at the Rome Masters, but lost to Benoit Paire in the second round. At Roland Garros he was 30th seed, he lost in the third round to Roger Federer.

At the Eastbourne grass tournament, the Frenchman beat Kevin Anderson in the first round, but lost to Bernard Tomic in the second round. At Wimbledon, he lost to Fernando Verdasco in the second round. Benneteau was defeated by Andy Murray in the third round of the Cincinnati Masters. At the US Open, he defeated Jérémy Chardy in the second round, but lost to Tomáš Berdych in the third round.

Benneteau reached the final of the 2013 Malaysian Open for the second year running after beating Stan Wawrinka, but was once again beaten in the final, this time by unseeded João Sousa in three sets. He had won the first set and was within a game of winning the title at 5-4 in the second set. At Valencia he won over Feliciano López in the first round, but lost to David Ferrer in the second round. He collected first-round losses at the Shanghai and Paris Masters.

In the 2014 season, Benneteau beat Jo-Wilfried Tsonga and Feliciano López to reach the Indian Wells Masters quarterfinals, where he lost to Novak Djokovic. At the Miami Masters, he won over Ernests Gulbis, but was defeated by Tommy Robredo. During the clay season, he claimed the Bordeaux Challenger, but lost to Facundo Bagnis in the first round of Roland Garros. At Eastbourne, Benneteau took wins over Yen-Hsun Lu and Gilles Simon, after which he lost to Sam Querrey in the quarterfinals. At Wimbledon, he again lost in the first round to Gilles Müller.

The Frenchman began the 2014 US Open Series with a second-round loss in Washington. At the Canada Masters, he defeated Lleyton Hewitt and Ernests Gulbis to reach the third round, where he was defeated by local Milos Raonic. Benneteau upset Stan Wawrinka to reach the Cincinnati Masters semifinals, where he lost to David Ferrer. At the US Open, he lost in the first round to Benoît Paire.

At the 2014 Malaysian Open, Benneteau defeated Pablo Cuevas in the quarterfinals and Ernests Gulbis in the semifinals to reach the finals for the third consecutive year where he unfortunately lost again, to Kei Nishikori.
At the Paris Masters in 2017, he reached the Semi-finals where he lost to Jack Sock.
At the 2018 Australian Open he reached the third round where he lost to Fabio Fognini. At the 2018 French Open, he beat Leonardo Mayer before losing to fifth seed Juan Martín del Potro in the second round.

Benneteau is also currently the Fed Cup Captain for France.

Significant finals

Grand Slam finals

Doubles: 2 (1 title, 1 runner-up)

Masters 1000 finals

Doubles: 6 (2 titles, 4 runners-up)

Olympic medal matches

Doubles: 1 (1 bronze medal)

ATP career finals

Singles: 10 (10 runners-up)

Doubles: 21 (12 titles, 9 runner-ups)

Performance timelines

Singles

Doubles

Record against top 10 players
Benneteau's match record against those who have been ranked in the top 10, with those who have been No. 1 in boldface

  Jürgen Melzer 6–2
  Marcos Baghdatis 5–2
  David Ferrer 5–6
  Jo-Wilfried Tsonga 5–6
  Ernests Gulbis 4–0
  Gilles Simon 4–6
  Radek Štěpánek 3–2
  Arnaud Clément 3–2
  Stan Wawrinka 3–1
  Kevin Anderson 3–1
  Nicolas Almagro 3–3
  Rainer Schüttler 2–1
  David Goffin 2–1
  Pablo Carreno Busta 2–1
  Lleyton Hewitt 2–2
  James Blake 2–2
  Grigor Dimitrov 2–3
  Tomáš Berdych 2–3
  Ivan Ljubičić 2–4
  Robin Söderling 2–4
  Gaël Monfils 2–4
  Mikhail Youzhny 2–4
  Roger Federer 2–6
  Tommy Robredo 2–6
  Dominic Thiem 1–0
  Mark Philippoussis 1–0
  Nicolas Massu 1–0
  Nikolay Davydenko 1–1
  Jonas Björkman 1–1
  Jack Sock 1–1
  Janko Tipsarević 1–2
  Fernando González 1–2
  Juan Carlos Ferrero 1–2
  Rafael Nadal 1–3
  Marin Čilić 1–3
  Milos Raonic 1–3
  Mardy Fish 1–3
  Lucas Pouille 1–3
  Kei Nishikori 1–4
  Novak Djokovic 1–6
  Andy Roddick 1–5
  Andre Agassi 0–1
  Carlos Moyá 0–1
  Guillermo Coria 0–1
  Thomas Enqvist 0–1
  Jiří Novák 0–1
  Gaston Gaudio 0–1
  Nicolas Lapentti 0–1
  John Isner 0–1
  Joachim Johansson 0–1
  Juan Monaco 0–1
  Marat Safin 0–2
  Tommy Haas 0–2
  Alexander Zverev 0–2
  David Nalbandian 0–2
  Sébastien Grosjean 0–2
  Nicolas Kiefer 0–2
  Juan Martín del Potro 0–3
  Mario Ančić 0–3
  Richard Gasquet 0–4
  Andy Murray 0–5
  Fernando Verdasco 0–5

* Statistics correct as of 12 June 2018.

Top 10 wins
He has an 18–50 (.265) record against players who were, at the time the match was played, ranked in the top 10.

References

External links

 
 
 
 Benneteau World Ranking History

1981 births
Living people
French expatriate sportspeople in Switzerland
French male tennis players
Sportspeople from Boulogne-Billancourt
Sportspeople from Bourg-en-Bresse
Tennis players from Geneva
US Open (tennis) champions
US Open (tennis) junior champions
Tennis players at the 2012 Summer Olympics
Olympic tennis players of France
Olympic medalists in tennis
Olympic bronze medalists for France
Medalists at the 2012 Summer Olympics
Knights of the Ordre national du Mérite
French Open champions
Grand Slam (tennis) champions in men's doubles
Grand Slam (tennis) champions in boys' doubles